The Brigantine Bridge is a vehicular bridge over Absecon Inlet in Atlantic County, New Jersey. It is located just west of the Atlantic Ocean in Atlantic City and the resort community of Brigantine, providing the only road access to Brigantine Island. It is owned and operated by the New Jersey Department of Transportation (NJDOT). The bridge carries New Jersey Route 87, which then becomes County Route 638 (Brigantine Boulevard) at its northern end. At its southern end it connects with the Atlantic City–Brigantine Connector.

History
The original bridge was built in 1924, at the cost of $1,000,000.00 and operated as a toll bridge, but was purchased by the county in 1925 and made a free span. It was lost in the Hurricane of 1938. Its replacement was also destroyed, in 1944.

Today's bridge was built in 1972.

The bridges have been locally known as the Brigantine Causeway, the Absecon Inlet Bridge, the Brigantine Boulevard Bridge and the Route 87 bridge. The 1972 bridge is designated as the Vincent S. Haneman Memorial Bridge, in honor of Vincent S. Haneman, an Associate Justice of the New Jersey Supreme Court from 1960 to 1971 who was a resident of Brigantine.

References

External links

Brigantine, New Jersey
Buildings and structures in Atlantic City, New Jersey
Bridges in Atlantic County, New Jersey
Road bridges in New Jersey